This is a list of the most popular individual tourist attractions in the United States, lists of tourist attractions organized by subject region, and a selection of other notable tourist attractions and destinations.

Times Square is the most visited public (not privately owned) tourist site in the United States, with about 50 million visitors annually.

Top tourist attractions

In 2021, the most visited tourist attractions in the U.S. were:

Landmarks
As of 2007, there are 2,462 registered National Historic Landmarks (NHL) recognized by the United States government.  Each major US city has thousands of landmarks. For example, New York City has 23,000 landmarks designated by the Landmarks Preservation Commission. These landmarks include various individual buildings, interiors, historic districts, and scenic sites which help define the culture and character of New York City.

Natural monuments

There are many natural monuments in the United States and they are a large tourist venue.

Sports 

Sporting events and their associated venues make up a significant percentage of tourist dollars in the US. Estimates of the US sports industry's size vary from $213 billion to $410 billion. In 1997, 25% of tourism receipts in the United States were related to sports tourism; this would have valued the market at approximately $350 billion annually. Many US sporting events routinely attract international visitors. The 1997 New York City Marathon attracted 12,000 participants from outside the US, out of 28,000 participants.

Hotels

Hotels can be both housing for tourists visiting a particular region or city, and destinations themselves, with many hotels having historic and cultural status.

Lists of tourist attractions in the United States

Lists by type of attraction
Art museums
List of botanical gardens and arboretums in the United States
Amusement parks
List of aquaria in the United States
List of beaches in the United States
List of casinos in the United States
List of castles in the United States
List of festivals in the United States
Mexican fiestas in the United States
List of heritage railroads in the United States
List of museums in the United States
List of areas in the National Park System:
National Battlefield Parks
National Historic Parks
National Lakeshores
National Military Parks
National Monuments
National Parks
National Recreation Areas
National Seashores
List of National Wildlife Refuges of the United States
List of nature centers in the United States
List of open-air and living history museums in the United States
List of Renaissance fairs
List of shopping malls in the United States
List of ski areas and resorts in the United States
List of auto racing tracks in the United States
List of indoor arenas in the United States
List of NASCAR tracks
Seaside resorts
List of U.S. stadiums by capacity
Tennis venues
Reenactment sites
List of U.S. National Forests
List of U.S. state parks
List of zoos in the United States
Wine festivals

Lists by city or region

List of attractions and events in Indianapolis
List of attractions and events in the Louisville metropolitan area
List of Orlando, Florida attractions
Attractions in Silicon Valley, California
List of Wilderness Areas in the Adirondack Park
List of lands at Disney theme parks
List of attractions and events in Jacksonville, Florida

Other tourist attractions and destinations

Myrtle Beach, South Carolina
Charleston, South Carolina
Hilton Head Island, South Carolina
Atlantic City, New Jersey, and the Boardwalk
California's Wine Country
Richmond Strip, Houston, Texas
New Orleans, Louisiana with the French Quarter
Hollywood, California
Outer Banks of North Carolina
Carolina Beach, North Carolina
Pennsylvania Dutch Country
Pocono Mountains, Pennsylvania
Salem, Massachusetts
Branson, Missouri
Wisconsin Dells, Wisconsin
Door County, Wisconsin § Attractions
Alamo Mission in San Antonio, Texas
Hanauma Bay, Hawaii
Miami, Florida
Key West, Florida
Aspen, Colorado
Soo Locks, Michigan
Martha's Vineyard
Cedar Point

Former tourist attractions
Borscht Belt, New York
Salton Sea, California
World Trade Center, New York

See also
Lists of tourist attractions

Notes

References

 
 
Tourism in the United States